Theodore Carl Albrecht (born October 8, 1954) is a former professional American football player who played offensive tackle for five seasons for the Chicago Bears.  Albrecht currently serves as an analyst for Northwestern University football broadcasts on WGN (AM) radio.

Early life and education 

Albrecht was born in Harvey, Illinois and moved with his family to northern California at the age of 3. He played football at Vallejo High School in Vallejo, California.

College career 

Albrecht earned a bachelor's degree in sociology at the University of California, Berkeley, where he started 33 straight games at offensive tackle, made several All-America teams and appeared on Bob Hope's Christmas show with the Associated Press All-America Squad.

Pro football career 

Albrecht was chosen in the first round of the 1977 NFL draft, and he played six seasons for the Chicago Bears as an offensive lineman.  He made the All-Rookie team in 1977 and was a Pro Bowl alternate in 1979.

Ultimately, Albrecht's bum back ended his career, and he announced his retirement at age 28 in 1983.

After football 

After retiring, Albrecht founded a travel agency, Albrecht Travel Systems, and began providing color commentary of Northwestern University football on WBBM (AM) radio.

Albrecht shifted to WGN (AM) radio in 1996 after that station picked up coverage of Northwestern University football radio broadcasts.  In early 2016, WGN and Northwestern announced a four-year extension of their contract through the end of the 2019-2020 season.  Albrecht has continued to do color commentary during Northwestern football broadcasts.

Personal 

Albrecht lives in Winnetka, Illinois. Albrecht was married to the late LuJean Reeder. He has two daughters with LuJean, Brianna and Ashley.

References

1954 births
Living people
People from Harvey, Illinois
Players of American football from Illinois
American football offensive tackles
California Golden Bears football players
Chicago Bears players
Sportspeople from Vallejo, California
Brian Piccolo Award winners